Acremodontina carinata is a species of sea snail, a marine gastropod mollusk in the family Trochaclididae, the false top snails.

References

 Powell A. W. B., New Zealand Mollusca, William Collins Publishers Ltd, Auckland, New Zealand 1979

External links
 To World Register of Marine Species

carinata
Gastropods described in 1940